Asheville Regional Airport  is a Class C airport near Interstate 26 near the town of Fletcher,  south of downtown Asheville, in the U.S. state of North Carolina, United States. It is owned by the Greater Asheville Regional Airport Authority. The Federal Aviation Administration (FAA) National Plan of Integrated Airport Systems for 2019–2023 categorized it as a small-hub primary commercial service facility. In 2019 it served an all-time record number of passengers for the airport, 1,616,762, an increase of 43% over 2018 and the sixth consecutive year of record traffic.

Facilities

In the year ending December 31, 2018, the airport had 61,298 aircraft operations, average 168 per day: 63% general aviation, 17% air taxi, 15% airline, and 5% military. In May 2020, 140 aircraft were based at the airport: 116 single-engine, 13 multi-engine, 9 jet, and 2 helicopter.

The airport sees the following jet airliners regularly:
 Airbus A320 (150 or 177 passengers)
 Boeing 737-800 (183 passengers)
 Airbus A319 (126 passengers)
 Boeing 717-200 (110 passengers)
 Canadair Regional Jet (CRJ200, CRJ700 and CRJ900 - 50, 65 or 76 passengers)

A Concorde supersonic transport (SST) visited AVL during a 1987 promotional tour and was snowed-in overnight. Chartered Boeing 747s (operated by United Airlines) have visited, as has an Airbus A340 during the visit of Charles, Prince of Wales, to the nearby Biltmore Estate in 1996. AVL's  runway can handle almost any aircraft.

In April 2010, President Barack Obama and First Lady Michelle Obama landed in Asheville aboard a Boeing C-32 (the USAF version of the Boeing 757-200) for a weekend getaway. In October 2011 President Obama landed in Asheville in the larger Boeing VC-25 (the USAF version of the Boeing 747-200) to kick off his North Carolina and Virginia bus tour promoting his jobs bill. He gave a speech at the airport, and cited potential enhancements at the airport as part of the jobs push.  President Obama returned to Asheville on February 13, 2013, on the same aircraft for a brief visit and speech at a nearby manufacturing facility.

The terminal building opened on June 7, 1961 (the airport opened in January 1961). A $20 million expansion and renovation project began in 1987. The expansion project was completed in 1992, which resulted in an expansion of the ticket lobby, baggage claim area, and administrative office space. A second-level boarding area and jetways were constructed, as well as an atrium to the existing lobby. The second-level boarding area was removed and the ground-level boarding areas were expanded and renovated in 2003, designed by McCreary/Snow Architects, PA and built by Wilkie Construction Company, Inc. In 2009, $17.8 million of improvements were completed, including a Guest Services center, an additional baggage carousel, rental car desks, offices and security enhancements. In November 2017, a new 1,300-space parking deck opened in front of the airport terminal.

As part of Project SOAR (Significant Opportunity for Aviation in our Region), a major airport improvement project, the existing runway (which was over 50 years old) was nearing the end of its useful life and required major reconstruction to continue its use into the future. Also, the existing runway did not meet the most current Federal Aviation Administration (FAA) requirements that were put in place long after the runway was originally constructed. In December 2015, a temporary runway was opened west of the existing runway (16/34). The temporary runway 35 Instrument Landing System (ILS) is operational, and Precision Approach Path Indicators (PAPI) are available on both ends of the runway. The runway magnetic compass heading has shifted slightly over the years, and runway 16/34 has been renamed to runway 17/35. The new runway entered service on November 5, 2020.

Asheville Regional Airport is a focus city for Allegiant Air which bases Airbus A320 family aircraft and crew at the airport.

Airline service:  1948-1996
In 1948, Capital Airlines, Delta Air Lines and Piedmont Airlines (1948-1989) served the former Asheville airport, all with Douglas DC-3s.  Capital flew nonstop to Charlotte and Knoxville; Delta flew nonstop to Greenville, SC, and Knoxville;  Piedmont flew nonstop to Tri-Cities, TN and Charlotte.

In 1959, the Asheville City Council would purchase property partially located in neighboring Henderson County for the development of the airport. The North Carolina General Assembly would pass a bill that would to redesign the boundaries of Buncombe and Henderson to include the proposed airport property entirely in Buncombe, allowing Asheville to annex the complete site.

In 1961, Capital Airlines flew Vickers Viscounts into the recently opened new airport with nonstop service to Atlanta, GA, Tri-Cities, TN and Winston/Salem. Capital was acquired by and merged into United Airlines which in 1963 flew Viscounts and Douglas DC-6Bs nonstop to Atlanta, Greensboro,  Raleigh/Durham and Washington D.C. National Airport. In 1966 Delta had one daily flight from Asheville, a Douglas DC-7 nonstop to Knoxville and direct to Louisville and Chicago O'Hare Airport. In 1966 Piedmont Fairchild F-27s and Martin 4-0-4s flew nonstop to Atlanta, Charlotte, Knoxville, Roanoke and Tri-Cities, TN.

Piedmont Airlines introduced Boeing 727-100s in 1967, a typical routing being Atlanta - Asheville - Winston/Salem - Roanoke - New York LaGuardia Airport. In 1969 United Boeing 737-200s flew nonstop to Atlanta and Raleigh/Durham while Delta McDonnell Douglas DC-9-30s flew nonstop to Knoxville with same plane service to Louisville and Chicago O'Hare Airport.

The April 1975 Official Airline Guide listed Delta, Piedmont and United serving Asheville.  Delta had one daily McDonnell Douglas DC-9-30 from Knoxville, originating at Chicago O'Hare Airport via Louisville.  Piedmont flew Boeing 737-200s, Fairchild Hiller FH-227s and NAMC YS-11s nonstop from Atlanta, Charleston, WV, Charlotte, Danville, VA, Fayetteville, NC, Greenville/Spartanburg, SC, Knoxville, Lynchburg, VA, Nashville, Roanoke, Tri-Cities, TN and Winston/Salem, and direct 737s from Memphis, Richmond, VA and Washington D.C. National Airport. United was flying nonstop Boeing 737-200s from Atlanta, Charleston, WV and Raleigh/Durham. In 1976 United flew direct to Tampa via Atlanta; in 1978 Piedmont 737s flew direct to Chicago O'Hare Airport via Tri-Cities, TN.

Piedmont was the only jet airline at Asheville in February 1985, with Boeing 727-200 and Fokker F28 Fellowship nonstops from Atlanta, Baltimore, Charlotte and Roanoke and one-stop 727s from Denver, Miami and New York LaGuardia Airport, plus one-stop F28s from New York Newark Airport according to the Official Airline Guide. This same OAG also lists nonstop Delta Connection (operated by Atlantic Southeast Airlines) de Havilland Canada DHC-7 Dash 7s and Short 360s from Atlanta, and Sunbird Airlines and Wheeler Airlines Beechcraft 99s from Charlotte and Raleigh/Durham, plus Wheeler nonstops from Tri-Cities, TN.

American Eagle BAe Jetstream 31s and Saab 340s began serving AVL from Nashville in 1986 and Raleigh-Durham in 1987. These flights ended in 1995 when American closed both hubs.

The April 1995 OAG listed six airlines at Asheville:  American Eagle, Delta, Delta Connection (operated by both Atlantic Southeast Airlines (ASA) and Comair), USAir (which had merged with Piedmont in 1989) and USAir Express.  Delta and Delta Connection (ASA) had a total of eight nonstops a day from Atlanta, Delta on McDonnell Douglas MD-80s and Delta Connection on ATR 72s and Embraer EMB-120 Brasilias. Delta Connection (operated by Comair) also had three EMB-120 Brasilias a day from Cincinnati, a Delta hub.  USAir and USAir Express had a total of nine nonstops a day from the USAir hub in Charlotte, USAir with Boeing 737-300s and McDonnell Douglas DC-9-30s and USAir Express with Short 360s.  USAir Express also had three nonstop Jetstream 31s a day from Raleigh/Durham, some stopping in Greenville/Spartanburg. Delta ended mainline jets to AVL in December 1995, with ASA taking over with British Aerospace 146 regional jets; however, Delta currently operates mainline Boeing 717-200 service nonstop to its Atlanta hub.

In 1996, Midway Airlines briefly flew to its hub at Raleigh-Durham via Midway Connection partner Corporate Airlines Jetstream 31s.

Airlines and destinations

Map 
Key: Green - Seasonal; Blue - Future; Lime - Asheville Regional Airport
{
  "type": "FeatureCollection",
  "features": [
    {
      "type": "Feature",
      "properties": {
        "text": "AVL",
        "marker-color": "46ea5f",
        "marker-symbol": "city",
        "marker-size": "large"
      },
      "geometry": {
        "type": "Point",
        "coordinates": [
          -82.54405975341798,
          35.429274106570226
        ]
      }
    },
    {
      "type": "Feature",
      "properties": {
        "marker-symbol": "airport"
      },
      "geometry": {
        "type": "Point",
        "coordinates": [
          -97.66691140830518,
          30.20250833753644
        ]
      }
    },
    {
      "type": "Feature",
      "properties": {
        "text": "BWI",
        "marker-symbol": "airport"
        },
      "geometry": {
        "type": "Point",
        "coordinates": [
          -76.66869163513185,
          39.179345612216075
        ]
      }
    },
    {
      "type": "Feature",
      "properties": {
        "marker-symbol": "airport"
      },
      "geometry": {
        "type": "Point",
        "coordinates": [
          -74.17749881744386,
          40.69125347718285
        ]
      }
    },
    {
      "type": "Feature",
      "properties": {
        "marker-symbol": "airport"
      },
      "geometry": {
        "type": "Point",
        "coordinates": [
          -73.87168407440187,
          40.772416878811576
        ]
      }
    },
    {
      "type": "Feature",
      "properties": {
        "marker-symbol": "airport"
      },
      "geometry": {
        "type": "Point",
        "coordinates": [
          -71.01794242858888,
          42.364885996366525
        ]
      }
    },
    {
      "type": "Feature",
      "properties": {
        "marker-symbol": "airport"
      },
      "geometry": {
        "type": "Point",
        "coordinates": [
          -75.2402973175049,
          39.877929604185184
        ]
      }
    },
    {
      "type": "Feature",
      "properties": {
        "marker-symbol": "airport"
      },
      "geometry": {
        "type": "Point",
        "coordinates": [
          -77.44794845581056,
          38.952801103303095
        ]
      }
    },
    {
      "type": "Feature",
      "properties": {
        "marker-symbol": "airport"
      },
      "geometry": {
        "type": "Point",
        "coordinates": [
          -80.94434738159181,
          35.220585235173004
        ]
      }
    },
    {
      "type": "Feature",
      "properties": {
        "marker-symbol": "airport"
      },
      "geometry": {
        "type": "Point",
        "coordinates": [
          -84.43400859832765,
          33.64056248832507
        ]
      }
    },
    {
      "type": "Feature",
      "properties": {
        "marker-symbol": "airport"
      },
      "geometry": {
        "type": "Point",
        "coordinates": [
          -81.24278068542482,
          28.77533303152516
        ]
      }
    },
    {
      "type": "Feature",
      "properties": {
        "marker-symbol": "airport"
      },
      "geometry": {
        "type": "Point",
        "coordinates": [
          -80.14586448669435,
          26.07035771262859
        ]
      }
    },
    {
      "type": "Feature",
      "properties": {
        "marker-symbol": "airport"
      },
      "geometry": {
        "type": "Point",
        "coordinates": [
          -82.00109481811525,
          26.91858781024024
        ]
      }
    },
    {
      "type": "Feature",
      "properties": {
        "marker-symbol": "airport"
      },
      "geometry": {
        "type": "Point",
        "coordinates": [
          -82.69065856933595,
          27.906754973639806
        ]
      }
    },
    {
      "type": "Feature",
      "properties": {
        "marker-symbol": "airport"
      },
      "geometry": {
        "type": "Point",
        "coordinates": [
          -82.55320072174074,
          27.387505871265052
        ]
      }
    },
    {
      "type": "Feature",
      "properties": {
        "marker-symbol": "airport"
      },
      "geometry": {
        "type": "Point",
        "coordinates": [
          -80.09234905242921,
          26.688876752901592
        ]
      }
    },
    {
      "type": "Feature",
      "properties": {
        "marker-symbol": "airport"
      },
      "geometry": {
        "type": "Point",
        "coordinates": [
          -87.74265289306642,
          41.78667304519471
        ]
      }
    },
    {
      "type": "Feature",
      "properties": {
        "marker-symbol": "airport"
      },
      "geometry": {
        "type": "Point",
        "coordinates": [
          -87.90573120117189,
          41.976730548744946
        ]
      }
    },
    {
      "type": "Feature",
      "properties": {
        "marker-symbol": "airport"
      },
      "geometry": {
        "type": "Point",
        "coordinates": [
          -115.15122413635255,
          36.08705549772256
        ]
      }
    },
    {
      "type": "Feature",
      "properties": {
        "marker-symbol": "airport"
      },
      "geometry": {
        "type": "Point",
        "coordinates": [
          -97.04034805297853,
          32.89718238484667
        ]
      }
    },
    {
      "type": "Feature",
      "properties": {
        "marker-symbol": "airport"
      },
      "geometry": {
        "type": "Point",
        "coordinates": [
          -95.28699874877931,
          29.647299868717134
        ]
      }
    },
    {
      "type": "Feature",
      "properties": {
        "marker-symbol": "airport"
      },
      "geometry": {
        "type": "Point",
        "coordinates": [
          -93.21006774902345,
          44.8835537486407
        ]
      }
    },
    {
      "type": "Feature",
      "properties": {
        "marker-symbol": "airport"
      },
      "geometry": {
        "type": "Point",
        "coordinates": [
          -81.7546319961548,
          24.55384218333016
        ]
      }
    },
    {
      "type": "Feature",
      "properties": {
        "marker-color": "228b22",
        "marker-symbol": "airport"
      },
      "geometry": {
        "type": "Point",
        "coordinates": [
          -86.4721441268921,
          30.396610181978538
        ]
      }
    },
    {
      "type": "Feature",
      "properties": {"marker-color": "228b22", "marker-symbol": "airport"},
      "geometry": {
        "type": "Point",
        "coordinates": [
          -77.04329967498781,
          38.85251314708563
        ]
      }
    },
    {
      "type": "Feature",
      "properties": {"marker-color": "0050d0", "marker-symbol": "airport"},
      "geometry": {
       "type": "Point",
       "coordinates": [
          -112.01166700000000,
          33.43416700000000
         ]  
       }
     }
   ]  
}

Statistics

Carrier shares

Top destinations

Accidents and incidents
On July 19, 1967, Piedmont Airlines Flight 22, a Boeing 727-100, collided in mid-air with a Cessna 310 just south of the airport in Hendersonville. The collision happened just moments after the 727 took off from the Asheville Airport. All 82 people on both planes were killed.

On March 14, 2003, a Cessna 177 Cardinal crashed into Old Fort Mountain after taking off from the airport. It killed author Amanda Davis, who was on a book tour promoting her first novel Wonder When You'll Miss Me, and her parents.

On October 27, 2004, a Beechcraft Duke crashed about 0.8 of a mile off the departure end of Runway 34 after an apparent right engine failure, killing all four people on board.

On May 4, 2007, a 1977 Cessna 182 en route to Asheville Regional Airport crashed near the airport, killing three Georgia men. Initial reports said that rapper Jay-Z was on board. The reports were false.

On October 6, 2017, a terrorist deposited a bag containing an improvised explosive device near the entrance to the Asheville Regional Airport terminal. The bomb was set to explode the following morning at 6:00 AM but was defused after being detected by bomb-sniffing dogs. The terrorist, Michael Christopher Estes, was arrested and faced two federal charges. Estes pleaded guilty to one count of unlawful possession of an explosive in an airport on January 12, 2018; the other charge was dismissed.

On December 27, 2019, a small plane crashed in the Western North Carolina Agricultural Center parking lot adjacent to the airport shortly after takeoff. All five people on board survived with injuries and escaped before the plane exploded.

References

External links

 
  at North Carolina DOT airport guide
 
 

1961 establishments in North Carolina
Airports established in 1961
Airports in North Carolina
Buildings and structures in Henderson County, North Carolina
Transportation in Buncombe County, North Carolina
Transportation in Henderson County, North Carolina